Parlour is a brand of frozen dessert currently produced by Nestlé. Parlour comes in many different flavours and is available mainly in Canada. Originally produced by Sealtest Ice Cream Parlor in the United States (and branded by Ault Foods) as an ice cream, it no longer meets the legal definition of ice cream due to a change in the recipe; the high content of palm oils (see Mellorine). Parlour now competes with bigger brands of ice cream such as: Chapman's, Breyers and others.

List of flavours 
 Butterscotch Sundae
 Chocolate
 Chocolate Chip
 French Vanilla
 Heavenly Hash
 Maple Walnut
 Mint Chocolate Swirl
 Neapolitan
 Spumone (discontinued)
 Strawberry
 Vanilla
 Cookies and Cream
 Nestlé Toll House (Chocolate Chip Cookie Sandwich (currently the newest flavour, consisting of French Vanilla Parlour sandwiched between two chocolate chip cookies.)

References

External links
 Nestlé Canada Parlour site

Ice cream brands
Nestlé brands